Andraca chrysocollis is a moth of the family Endromidae. It is found in the Philippines (Luzon).

The wingspan is 39–42 mm. The wing shapes, ground colour and wing pattern are very similar to Andraca apodecta, but the pattern is more vague and the bluish scales are mainly found in the basal part of the forewing. The discal spot is small, dark grey and pointed with a few bluish scales. Adults are on wing in April and from September to October, probably in multiple generations per year.

References

Moths described in 2012
Andraca